As Men Love is a lost 1917 American drama silent film directed by E. Mason Hopper, and written by Adele Harris and Lois Zellner. The film stars House Peters, Sr., Myrtle Stedman, Jack W. Johnston, and Helen Jerome Eddy. The film was released on March 29, 1917, by Paramount Pictures.

Plot

Cast 
House Peters, Sr. as Paul Russell
Myrtle Stedman as Diana Gordon
Jack W. Johnston as Keith Gordon 
Helen Jerome Eddy as Marjorie Gordon

References

External links 
 

1917 films
1910s English-language films
Silent American drama films
1917 drama films
Paramount Pictures films
Films directed by E. Mason Hopper
American black-and-white films
American silent feature films
Lost American films
1917 lost films
Lost drama films
1910s American films